Martin Wolf (born 1946) is a British journalist. 

Martin Wolf, Wolff, or Woolf, may also refer to:

Martin Wolf (investment banker) (fl. 1990s–2020s), American investment banker
Martin Wolf (Physicist) (born 1961), German experimental physicist
Martin Wolff (1872–1953), German professor of law
Martin Wolff (sculptor) (1852–1919), German artist
Martin Woolf (1858–1928), Canadian politician and civil servant

See also
Martine Wolff (born 1996), Norwegian female handball player